I Trapped the Devil is a 2019 American supernatural horror film written, produced, edited, and directed by Josh Lobo in his feature film directorial debut. It stars A. J. Bowen, Scott Poythress, Susan Theresa Burke, Jocelin Donahue, and Chris Sullivan. It premiered at the Imagine Film Festival on April 12, 2019, and IFC Midnight released the film theatrically in the United States and simultaneously via video-on-demand platforms on April 26, 2019.

Plot 

Matt and his wife Karen arrive unexpectedly to visit Matt's troubled brother Steve for the Christmas holidays. Based on the blacked-out windows and odd atmosphere, Matt tells Karen that something feels wrong. Steve repeatedly sees visions of his dead wife Sarah through television static while also taking disturbing phone calls from someone unknown.

Following several tense conversations between the three of them, Steve shows Matt and Karen a padlocked door bearing a cross in the basement. Matt and Karen hear a man's voice ask for help from the other side. Steve astonishingly claims that the imprisoned man is the devil.

When they return upstairs, Steve dodges questions about details by simply saying that something evil conjured itself into the shape of a man, and he trapped it behind the door. Steve pleads with Matt and Karen to believe him, adding that he knows his claim sounds crazy, but they cannot tell anyone else because no one will believe it either.

Wanting to understand his brother's reasoning, Matt entertains the idea that Steve captured the devil. Karen refuses to be complicit in a possible crime and demands action be taken. Matt insists that he does not want Steve to go to prison and suggests they simply let the man go and get mental help for Steve.

The two brothers have a conversation about their broken relationship. Steve shows Matt a book that identifies the devil as a presence that manipulates people into committing heinous acts such as murder. Steve claims that by trapping the devil, he has trapped the seed of evil thoughts and instincts that the devil exploits.

Steve takes Matt to a room of newspaper clippings connected by numerous strings to illustrate how he discovered the devil's pattern. Steve shows Matt a flyer for a missing girl who recently returned home. Steve explains that he thinks others will return, too, because the devil is currently trapped.

Matt asks who has been calling Steve on the phone. Steve says he thinks someone is coming for the devil. Steve adds that he thinks someone or something also influenced Matt to show up at this critical juncture in the devil's imprisonment.

Left alone, Karen returns to the basement door to unlock it as the man's voice pleads with her. When an odd feeling causes Karen to hesitate, the man begins taunting her.

Steve pulls Karen out of the basement. While pointing his handgun at her and Matt, Steve questions Karen regarding what the man said to her. Matt forces his brother to put down the gun. Steve tells Karen he knows she felt something evil.

The power flickers. Steve boards up several windows. After consoling each other over what to do, Matt and Karen fall asleep. Steve falls asleep too.

Another vision of Sarah in TV static wakes Steve. Steve taunts the imprisoned man by asking what it feels like to be helpless.

Woken by a strange feeling, Matt reexamines Steve's pattern walls. Matt pauses on a newspaper with the headline “Christmas Crash Claims Lives – Brentville Father Grieves.”

Karen confronts Steve in front of the locked door. Steve speaks cryptically about the tragic accident that took the lives of his wife Sarah and their young daughter. Steve says that the man responsible is not evil for what he did, but that evil let it happen. Steve adds, “evil is whatever hurts you the most.”

Steve challenges Karen to open the door so that she can see for herself and so he can see whatever it shows her. Before she can act, Steve renders Karen unconscious with chloroform and locks her in the basement.

After taking another phone call, Steve locks Matt in the pattern room. While Matt escapes and reconnects with his wife, Steve encounters a vision of a longhaired man holding Steve's daughter's stuffed bunny toy in two pieces. The man says, “please help; I can’t stop the bleeding.”

Blood gushing from the man's hands transports Steve to another vision where Sarah wears a blindfold. Realizing she is not real as the vision becomes more terrifying, Steve prepares to shoot Sarah.

Matt and Karen shake Steve back to reality. Matt talks Steve into giving up the gun by saying although he was not there for his brother before, he is there for him now.

Matt goes to free the man in the basement. Karen tells Matt something is wrong even though she cannot explain it. Matt insists that the man is not the devil. Steve pleads with his brother to reconsider. When Matt continues forward, Steve stabs Matt's stomach. Matt dies. Steve goes upstairs, distraught.

Karen confronts Steve in the kitchen. Steve explains that he did not intend to kill his brother, but Matt would not stop. Steve also tells Karen that she can see “her” if she opens the door. Karen shoots Steve dead.

Karen goes back downstairs. The imprisoned man taunts Karen by saying they can save Matt together if she opens the door. Karen does not open the door.

Cops Alan and Ben are called to the house. Alan sees a vision of Santa in the television static. After finding Steve's body, Alan goes downstairs. The man pleads for Alan to open the door. Alan and Karen end up shooting each other.

The gunshots summon Ben to the cellar. Entranced by the atmosphere, Ben opens the door. A little girl walks past the entranced cop as well as Matt and Karen's bodies slumped on the floor. The girl exits outside through the front door.

Cast

Critical response
The site's consensus reads, "A slow burning horror story that takes spine-tingling advantage of its setting and cast, I Trapped the Devil marks an auspicious debut for writer-director Josh Lobo." On Metacritic, it has a weighted average score of 47 out of 100 based on seven reviews.

References

External links 
 
 

2019 films
2019 horror films
2019 independent films
2010s Christmas horror films
2010s supernatural horror films
American independent films
American supernatural horror films
American Christmas horror films
2010s English-language films
2010s American films